"I Cannot Believe It's True" is a song by Phil Collins from his second solo album Hello, I Must Be Going!. The third US single released from the album, and was only released in the US and Canada; internationally, it had instead been released as the B-side of "You Can't Hurry Love".

Cash Box noted the "cowbell-like" percussion and "Collins' profound pop tunesmithing." 

The song found moderate success on the Billboard Hot 100, reaching #79.

Track listing

U.S. 7" single (Atlantic)
 "I Cannot Believe It's True"
 "Thru These Walls"

U.S. 12" promo single (Atlantic)
 "I Cannot Believe It's True"
 "I Cannot Believe It's True" (live on 19 December 1982 in Pasadena, California at Perkins Palace)

Charts

Credits 
 Phil Collins – keyboards, drums, vocals, percussion
 Daryl Stuermer – guitars
 John Giblin – bass
 Don Myrick – alto sax solo
 Don Myrick, Louis "Louie Louie" Satterfield, Rhamlee Michael Davis and Michael Harris – Phenix Horns
 Don Myrick, Louis "Louie Louie" Satterfield, Rhamlee Michael Davis, Phil Collins and Peter Newton – Phenix Choir

Live version 
 Phil Collins – vocals, Rhodes piano
 J. Peter Robinson – keyboards, vocoder
 Daryl Stuermer – guitar
 Mo Foster – bass
 Chester Thompson – drums
 Don Myrick – alto sax solo
 Don Myrick, Louis "Louie Louie" Satterfield, Rhamlee Michael Davis and Michael Harris – Phenix Horns

References

1983 singles
Phil Collins songs
Virgin Records singles
Song recordings produced by Hugh Padgham
Song recordings produced by Phil Collins
Songs written by Phil Collins